Lumbrical may refer to: 
 Lumbricals of the hand 
 Lumbricals of the foot